Kinney Lake is a  lake located in Mount Robson Provincial Park of British Columbia, Canada. The lake can be reached by following the Berg Lake Trail for 4.2 kilometres.  The lake is an expansion of the Robson River (a tributary of the upper Fraser River) and is located about halfway between the river's source and its mouth. It was named by Arthur Philemon Coleman, Canadian geologist, who explored the region with his friend, George Kinney, who spotted the lake first.

See also 

Robson Lake

References 

Regional District of Fraser-Fort George
Lakes of British Columbia
Robson Valley
Canadian Rockies
Mount Robson Provincial Park